Dear(s) or The Dears may refer to:

Organizations
 Duearity – a Swedish medtech company which trades on Nasdaq First North under ticker symbol DEAR.

Manga
 Dear (manga), a 2002–2007 Japanese manga series by Cocoa Fujiwara
 DearS, a 2002–2005 Japanese manga series by Peach-Pit, and a 2004 anime series and visual novel
Dear+, a Japanese manga magazine

Music
 Dears (band), a Taiwanese duo
 The Dears, a Canadian rock band
 Dear (Apink album) or the title song, "Dear (Whisper)", 2016
 Dear (Boris album) or the title song, 2017
 Dear (Hey! Say! JUMP album) or the title song, 2016
 Dear (Shion Miyawaki album), 2008
 "Dear" (Mika Nakashima song), 2011
 "Dear" (Vivid song), 2009
Dear., a 2018 EP by Cavetown

Other uses
 Dear (surname)
 Drop Everything And Read, a school-based sustained silent reading program

See also
 Dear... (disambiguation)
 Dear Dear, a 1992 album by 54-40
 Deer (disambiguation)
 Salutation
 Term of endearment